Kaleeshwari Devi (born 4 November 1970) better known by her stage name Saleema is an  Indian actress who predominantly acts in Malayalam films. She is best known for her portrayal of Ammini in Aranyakam and Lakshmi in Nakhakshathangal. She is the daughter of Telugu actress Girija.

Background
She made her Malayalam debut with Nakhakshathangal in 1986. She had acted in a few Tamil, Kannada and Telugu movies as well. She remained largely invisible in the film industry for many years. She made her comeback to Malayalam film industry through Munthiri Monchan: Oru Thavala Paranja Kadha in 2019.

Filmography 
Films

 Television

 Television shows as guest
 Onnum Onnum Moonu - Mazhavil Manorama
 Annies Kitchen - Amrita TV
 Varthaprabhatham - Asianet News
 Yours Truly - Mathrubhumi News

References

External links

 Saleema at MSI

Actresses in Malayalam cinema
Actresses in Tamil cinema
Actresses in Telugu cinema
Indian film actresses
Actresses in Kannada cinema
Living people
Actresses from Andhra Pradesh
20th-century Indian actresses
1973 births
Actresses in Tamil television